Jean-Paul Comart (born 27 September 1953) is a Belgian actor best known for his appearances in French film in the 1980s. He has appeared in films, TV and in the theatre.

Since 2000, Comart has mostly appeared on television, playing Inspector Miller in the series Trois femmes flics amongst other roles.

Theater

Filmography

External links 

 Jean-Paul Comart at Artmédia

Belgian male actors
Belgian male film actors
Belgian male television actors
1953 births
Living people
20th-century Belgian male actors
21st-century Belgian male actors